Financial Express may refer to:

The Financial Express (Bangladesh), an English daily newspaper in Bangladesh
The Financial Express (India), an English daily business newspaper in India